Capelle Centrum is a subway station on Line C of the Rotterdam Metro and is situated in the town of Capelle aan den IJssel, just east of Rotterdam.

The station was opened on 26 May 1994 as part of the extension of the East-West Line or Caland Line from Capelsebrug station towards De Terp station. The station consists of two tracks with a platform on both sides. Near the station is shopping mall de Koperwiek. Also RET bus 31 to Oostgaarde stops once every half an hour near the station.

Rotterdam Metro stations
Capelle aan den IJssel
Railway stations opened in 1994
1994 establishments in the Netherlands
Railway stations in the Netherlands opened in the 20th century